Brent McMahon (born September 17, 1980 in Kelowna, British Columbia) is a triathlete from Canada.

McMahon competed in the second Olympic triathlon at the 2004 Summer Olympics.  He was hampered by injuries, and placed thirty-ninth with a total time of 1:59:44.57.

At the 2007 Pan American Games, McMahon won the silver medal, after being narrowly beaten by American Andy Potts.

On August 14, 2011, Brent won his first Triathlon World Cup event in Tiszaújváros, Hungary.

At the 2012 Summer Olympics, he finished in 27th place.

McMahon went to Handsworth Secondary School in the District of North Vancouver, British Columbia.

See also
List of Canadian sports personalities

References

1980 births
Canadian male triathletes
Duathletes
Living people
Olympic triathletes of Canada
Sportspeople from Kelowna
Triathletes at the 2003 Pan American Games
Triathletes at the 2007 Pan American Games
Triathletes at the 2011 Pan American Games
Triathletes at the 2004 Summer Olympics
Triathletes at the 2012 Summer Olympics
Pan American Games silver medalists for Canada
Pan American Games bronze medalists for Canada
Pan American Games medalists in triathlon
Medalists at the 2011 Pan American Games
20th-century Canadian people
21st-century Canadian people